Fokasi Wilbrod Fullah (born 4 May 1970) is a Tanzanian long-distance runner. He competed in the men's marathon at the 2000 Summer Olympics.

References

External links
 

1970 births
Living people
Athletes (track and field) at the 2000 Summer Olympics
Tanzanian male long-distance runners
Tanzanian male marathon runners
Olympic athletes of Tanzania
Place of birth missing (living people)
African Games medalists in athletics (track and field)
African Games silver medalists for Tanzania
Athletes (track and field) at the 1999 All-Africa Games